Dennis Murray may refer to:

 Dennis Murray (politician) (born 1962), member of the Ohio House of Representatives
 Dennis A. Murray, pastor televangelist
 Dennis J. Murray, current President Emeritus of Marist College

See also
 Dennis, Murray County, Georgia, USA
 Denis Murray (disambiguation)